Quimbango is a commune of Angola, located in the province of Malanje.

References 

Populated places in Malanje Province